Henryda Chemical (often transliterated as Henglida Chemical) is a chemical plant in the Xiangshui Ecological Chemical Industrial Park, Jiangsu, China.

History 
In July 2016, acquisition by Jiangsu Wuzhong Group was completed.

On Apr 19, 2018,  required a "thoroughly checking" of pollution issues in the three industrial zones (and Chenjiagang. Henryda Chemical was ordered to stop production afterwards. 

On Dec 28, 2018, Henryda Chemical announced that it will continue production on Dec 29, as permitted by the County Government.

Henryda Chemical was affected by the blast wave. Roof went collapsed. Windows and doors were blown out. Production was stopped again, with no known resuming date.

See also 
 2019 Xiangshui chemical plant explosion
 Tianjiayi Chemical
 Chenjiagang Town

References 

Xiangshui